Berberis lanceolata is a shrub in the Berberidaceae described as a species in 1840. It is endemic to Mexico, found in the States of Hidalgo, Oaxaca, Veracruz, and Puebla.

References

Flora of Mexico
lanceolata
Plants described in 1840